Priceless may refer to:

 Something so rare, unique or desirable that it transcends normal concepts of price; in other words, it cannot be sold at any price
 Priceless (2006 film) (aka Hors de prix), a 2006 French film starring Audrey Tautou
 Priceless (2016 film), an American film starring Joel Smallbone
 Priceless (horse), a horse that competed at Olympic level in eventing
 Priceless (manhwa), a three-volume graphic novel series by Lee Young You
 Priceless (professional wrestling), the former name for tag team and stable of Ted DiBiase, Jr. and Cody Rhodes
 Priceless (TV series), 2012 Japanese television drama starring actor Takuya Kimura
 Priceless (advertising campaign), a long-running and successful ad campaign of MasterCard that has entered into the lexicon of common pop culture

Music
Priceless (Birdman album), 2009 rap album
Priceless (Elkie Brooks album), a compilation album by Elkie Brooks
Priceless (Frankie J album), 2006
Priceless (Kelly Price album), 2003 R&B and soul album
"Priceless" (Mayday Parade song), a song on the 2011 album Mayday Parade
"Priceless" (song), 2009 song by Canadian R&B singer Melanie Fiona
"Priceless", a song by Flo Rida off his debut album
"Priceless", a song by Jolin Tsai from the 2007 album Agent J
"Priceless", a song by For King & Country (band) off the 2014 album Run Wild. Live Free. Love Strong.

People
Priceless the Kid (born 1987), American artist, musician, and song writer

See also
 Price (disambiguation)